Ibighi, also known as Ibigi, is an Ward in Rungwe District, Mbeya Region, Tanzania. 
In 2016 the Tanzania National Bureau of Statistics report there were 9,808 people in the ward, from 8,899 in 2012.

Villages 
The ward has two villages Katumba, and Ilinga.

References

Wards of Mbeya Region
Rungwe District
Constituencies of Tanzania